Natalia Duco Soler (born 31 January 1989 in San Felipe, Valparaíso) is a Chilean shot putter.

Duco finished fourth at the 2005 World Youth Championships, twelfth at the 2006 World Junior Championships and won the gold medal at the 2008 World Junior Championships. She also competed at the 2008 Olympic Games without reaching the final round.

Duco's personal best throw (and Chilean national record) is 18.80 metres, achieved in August 2012 at the London Olympics, where she qualified for the final, finishing ninth.

She also reached the final of the 2016 Olympic Games.

Personal bests
Shot put: 18.80 m –  London, 6 August 2012

Achievements

References

External links
 
 Sports reference biography

1989 births
Living people
Chilean female shot putters
Athletes (track and field) at the 2008 Summer Olympics
Athletes (track and field) at the 2012 Summer Olympics
Athletes (track and field) at the 2016 Summer Olympics
Athletes (track and field) at the 2011 Pan American Games
Olympic athletes of Chile
People from San Felipe, Chile
Athletes (track and field) at the 2015 Pan American Games
World Athletics Championships athletes for Chile
Pan American Games bronze medalists for Chile
Pan American Games medalists in athletics (track and field)
Universiade medalists in athletics (track and field)
South American Games gold medalists for Chile
South American Games medalists in athletics
Competitors at the 2014 South American Games
Athletes (track and field) at the 2018 South American Games
Universiade bronze medalists for Chile
Medalists at the 2015 Pan American Games
South American Games gold medalists in athletics
Gabriela Mistral University alumni
21st-century Chilean women